Life After Death (lit. The People I Have Loved) is a 2020 Hong Kong romantic melodrama television series starring Frankie Lam, Priscilla Wong, Mark Ma and Shiga Lin. Produced by Kwan Shu-ming and Kwan Man-sum, the series premiered on TVB on June 8, 2020.

Synopsis 
A deadly car accident leaves both Keung Yuk-sing (Frankie Lam) and Laura Fong Lok-man (Priscilla Wong) widowed. Seven years later, another accident has Yuk-sing encounter Laura. Laura rekindles her bond with her estranged sister Sherman Fong Shu-man (Shiga Lin) with the help of Dr. Koo Hei-sun (Mark Ma), who has Asperger syndrome. Laura grieves the passing of her mother-in-law and is trying to taking care of her daughter Chu Hang-yee and stepson Chu Ka-bing, while Yuk-sing struggles to understand the needs of his teenage daughter Keung Chi-yau. As Ka-bing and Chi-yau get closer, their mutual friend Eden Mok Yu-him creates more problems for their relationship, and the truth of the car accident gradually surfaces, forcing everyone to face changes again.

Cast and characters  

 Frankie Lam as Keung Yuk-sing, a boxing instructor
 Priscilla Wong as Laura Fong Lok-man, an insurance agent
 Mark Ma as Koo Hei-sun, a family doctor with Asperger syndrome; a colleague of Sherman.
Shiga Lin as Sherman Fong Shu-man, Laura’s younger sister, an obstetrician and gynecologist
 Yoyo Chen as Sabrina Chin Li-woon, a manager at Laura's insurance company, Laura and Sherman’s close friend
 Stephen Wong as Kung Ka-ho, a trading company CEO
 Kyle Li as Eden Mok Yu-him, a student at Yuk-sing's boxing club
 Chloe So as Yoyo Keung Tsz-yau, Yuk-sing's teenage daughter
 Zeno Koo as Ben Chu Ka-bing, a high school student and Laura's stepson
 Rainbow Ching as Au Lai-hing, Hei-sun’s mother
 Grace Wong Chi-ching as Chu Hang-yee, Laura's daughter
 Erin Wong as Kung Chin-chin 
 Griselda Yeung (special guest star) as Mavis, deceased wife of Yuk-sing
 William Chak (special guest star) as Chu Hon-fai, deceased husband of Laura
 Mary Hon as Mavis' mother
 James Ng as himself (guest appearance)
 Andrew Yuen as a dog trainer (guest appearance)

Themes
The theme, revolving around family relationships, highlights conflicts caused by miscommunication. It uses the event of a car accident to symbolize the hardships encountered in life and how one overcomes them.

Reception
The television series placed fifth in 2020 Yahoo Hong Kong "Top Ten Most Searched Television Dramas" Popularity list. It was also named by Hong Kong Economic Times as one among the most popular television series of the year.

Music 
The soundtrack for Life After Death consists of 4 individually released singles as follows:

Awards and nominations

Notes

References

2020 Hong Kong television series debuts
Hong Kong drama television series
Hong Kong romance television series
TVB dramas
TVB original programming